Llanerchymedd railway station was situated on the Anglesey Central Railway line from Gaerwen to Amlwch. There was a single platform with a small station building located on the Up (east) side of the track. Three sidings and two small goods sheds made a small goods yard, which was up on the Up side.

All stations on the Anglesey Central line closed to passengers in 1964 (the sidings and all buildings but the station building itself were removed) as part of the Beeching Axe although freight works continued until 1993. The station building is owned by Isle of Anglesey County Council and reopened as a heritage centre, museum and community café in 2010.  There is also the possibility of re-opening at least part of the branch to passengers.

References

Further reading

Disused railway stations in Anglesey
Beeching closures in Wales
Railway stations in Great Britain opened in 1866
Railway stations in Great Britain closed in 1964
1866 establishments in Wales
Llannerch-y-medd
Former London and North Western Railway stations
1964 disestablishments in Wales